Space Pets were a line of pneumatic-powered toys designed, manufactured and marketed by TOMY (Takara) for the American market in the early 1980s.

Design 
The basic principle was to use a small air tank to capture, compress and controllably release air power and convert it into mechanical motion. Each Space Pet shipped with a "Tomy air pump" that was used to recharge the air tank. The air pump resembled a bicycle pump, although smaller. The flagship model was the "High Hopping Hoomdorm", which was something of a mechanical grasshopper that would hop furiously (and somewhat erratically) across the room. Other models included the "Stretch Legged Stoomdorm" which propelled itself in an accordion-like fashion, the "Fleet Footed Floomdorm" which sort of shuffled along on pie-shaped feet and the "Lurch Along Loomdorm" which raises up by means of scissor action, then fell forward and retracted its feet. There were four models in total. The entire Space Pets line was closely related to TOMY Air Powered Vehicle line. Variations of Space Pets were sold under other names outside of the US. For example, the "High Hopping Hoomdorm" was packaged and sold as the "Sky Hopper" in the United Kingdom. Likewise, "Lunar Legs" was an alias for the "Stretch Legged Stoomdorm".

Hoomdorms, in particular, were manufactured in two places: Singapore for distribution in Australia, and Japan for the United States.

External links
 https://www.webcitation.org/query?url=http://www.geocities.com/SunsetStrip/8410/hoomdorm.html&date=2009-10-25+10:10:13
 http://www.jeffbots.com/stoomdorm.html
http://www.collectiondx.com/toy_review/1981/stretch_legged_stoomdorm

1980s toys
Physical activity and dexterity toys